The Michigan Amish Fellowship is a subgroup or affiliation of Old Order Amish. In 2022 his network of churches consisted of 33 settlements in Michigan, Maine, Missouri, Kentucky, Montana, and Wyoming. Stephen E. Scott described the affiliation  which emerged in 1970 in Michigan as "Amish Reformist".

This affiliation which is an atypical Amish Community is more evangelical and more open to outsiders, so-called "seekers", than other Old Order Amish affiliations.

History 

The church at Mio was founded in 1970 by Amish people from Geauga County, Ohio, and from northern Indiana. Other local churches that now are affiliated with the Michigan Amish Churches originally were not Amish, but were founded by evangelistic minded people from several Old Order Anabaptist backgrounds, who were more open to outsiders than typical Old Order Amish. Later these congregations joined the Michigan Amish Churches.

The church at Manton, originally not Amish, was started by people, who came from Le Roy, Michigan, a horse-and-buggy, but eagerly evangelistic church that was founded in 1981 by Harry Wanner (1935–2012), an awakened minister of Stauffer Old Order Mennonite background. In 1994 the church at Le Roy disbanded. The church at Manton eventually joined the Old Order Amish. The Church at Smyrna, Maine, originally affiliated with the "Christian Communities" of Elmo Stoll, also more evangelistic and open to seekers, affiliated with Manton after the "Christian Communities" disbanded after Stoll's early death.

Custom and belief 

It is stated that there are more people among the Michigan Amish Churches that feel sure to be saved or consider themselves to be born again Christians than among other subgroups of Old Order Amish. In accordance with that, G.C. Waldrep stated that the Michigan Churches show many spiritual and material similarities to the New Orders, while they are still technically considered a part of the larger Old Order group.

Settlements and congregations 

In 2011 the subgroup was present in 15 settlements in 3 states and had 20 congregations or church districts. In Michigan the subgroup has settlements in Mio, Evart, Fremont, Manton and Newaygo. In Maine there were three settlements: Smyrna, Unity and Patton. The Amish near Pearisburg, Virginia, are partly affiliated with the Michigan Churches while another part belongs to the Believers in Christ, Lobelville, a para-Amish group.

References

External links 

 "Amish Scenes From Smyrna – Part I" at amish365.com
 "My Amish Reality: Chapter 2 – Manton, Michigan" at amish365.com
 "Smyrna, Maine Amish – Part III" at amish365.com
 "Smyrna, Maine: Pioneer Place" at amish365.com
 Mike Norton: "Amish community thrives near Manton"
 Jeff Smith: "Becoming Amish: One Grosse Pointe Family’s Journey to a Simpler Life" at mynorth.com, about the Moser family, seekers who joined the Amish and live at Marion, Michigan.

Literature 
 Donald B. Kraybill, Karen M. Johnson-Weiner and Steven M. Nolt: The Amish, Johns Hopkins University Press, Baltimore MD 2013. 
 Charles Hurst and David McConnell: An Amish Paradox. Diversity and Change in the World's Largest Amish Community, Johns Hopkins University Press, Baltimore MD 2010 

Amish in the United States
Old Order Amish
Anabaptist denominations established in the 20th century
Christian communities